The Magadha period refers to the era in the history of Indian subcontinent when several Magadha based empires or Magadha Empires asserted dominance over the region.

A table of its rulers is shown below. For a general view of the history and culture of the Magadha region, see Magadha.

Magadha empire may refer to:

See also
 Magadha
 Magadha-Vajji war
 Magadha-Anga war
 Avanti-Magadhan Wars
 List of Indian monarchs

References

Magadha
History of India